Edith Emily Morris (6 December 1895–28 December 1965) was a New Zealand jewellery designer and silversmith. She was born in Hougham, Kent, England on 6 December 1895.

References

1895 births
1965 deaths
New Zealand women artists
British jewellery designers
Silversmiths
Women silversmiths
20th-century New Zealand artists
English emigrants to New Zealand
People from Dover District
Women jewellers